Bankim Bihari Pal  (1 July 1905 – 31 December 1979) was a revolutionary in British India and a political leader after Indian Independence in 1947.

Early life and education 
Pal was born on1 July 1905  in Medinipur, in the present Purba Medinipur district  into a Hindu family. He was involved in political activities from his school days. Although he was a supporter of Gandhi's nonviolence movement but he supports his BV friends and for some time. He was worked for them as a middleman between BV Swadeshi dacoits and BV action squad members. For that reason he includes women from prostitute areas.

Later activities
In 1940, he participated in the Satyagraha movement of Gandhi. In August 1942 he played a lead role in launching an anti-British movement in undivided Midnapore.He started Roadshow (Swadeshi Street dramas) for the first time in Midnapore. For that reason he writes several plays, acted and directed himself with the help of local peoples and prostitutes. 
After independence of India, Pal won several elections as a councillor in Midnapore Municipality, which included the Midnapore seat of West Bengal Assembly in 1977, as a Janata Party member. He founded the Shahid Prososti Samiti. He died on 31 December 1979, owing to prolonged sickness.

References

Bengali politicians
People from Paschim Medinipur district
1905 births
1979 deaths
Janata Party politicians
West Bengal MLAs 1977–1982